Eugene Cordero is an American actor, writer, and comedian. Frequently appearing in comedic roles, he has been featured as a series regular on the comedies Other Space (2015), Bajillion Dollar Propertie$ (2017–2019), Tacoma FD (2019–present), and Star Trek: Lower Decks (2020–present). His television appearances also include recurring roles on House of Lies (2014), Crazy Ex-Girlfriend (2015–2017), The Good Place (2016–2020), and Wrecked (2018). Outside of comedy, he has been a series regular on the Disney+ series Loki since 2021. Cordero's film roles include the comedy-drama The Kings of Summer (2013), the monster adventure Kong: Skull Island (2017), and the crime drama The Mule (2018).

Early life and education
Cordero grew up in the northern suburbs of Detroit. He later moved to New York City to attend Marymount Manhattan College.

He began improv with Chicago City Limits before taking classes at Upright Citizens Brigade and performing as a member of ASSSSCAT.

Career
Cordero has worked largely in comedy, appearing in such televisions shows as Drunk History, Kroll Show, Silicon Valley, The Office, Brooklyn Nine-Nine, Bajillion Dollar Propertie$, Veep, The Good Place, and Crazy Ex-Girlfriend. Cordero landed a guest role on Hawaii Five-0 after making a sketch about the show's lack of diversity. Cordero was one of the main characters in Yahoo!'s 2015 sci-fi comedy series Other Space. In 2019, Cordero began a starring role on Tacoma FD and made an appearance on The Mandalorian. In April 2021, it was announced that he would be joining the cast of the Disney+ series Loki.

Beginning in 2013, Cordero voiced Jamie in the Cartoon Network series Steven Universe. He also voiced Sawyer D. and Brian on Bob's Burgers. He voiced Ensign Sam Rutherford on Star Trek: Lower Decks, which premiered in 2020.

Cordero has appeared in films such as Mike and Dave Need Wedding Dates, Kong: Skull Island, The Kings of Summer, and Ghostbusters.

Cordero has appeared several times on the Comedy Bang! Bang! podcast and television show. Cordero is the co-host of a fitness podcast with Ryan Stanger called The Dumbbells.

Personal life
Cordero is of Filipino descent. He lives in Los Angeles. Cordero was high school classmates with comedian Andy Juett at Brother Rice High School in Michigan, whom he later collaborated with at Sexpot Comedy. Cordero is married to comedy writer Tricia McAlpin. They have two children.

Filmography

Film

Television

References

External links
 

Year of birth missing (living people)
Living people
American male actors of Filipino descent
Upright Citizens Brigade Theater performers